Žan Marolt (25 September 1964 – 11 July 2009) was a Bosnian actor and TV personality. He was a regular actor of the Chamber Theatre 55 where he made numerous roles in the theater, in plays such as Buba u uhu, Umri muški, Kidaj od svoje žene, Ujak Vanja and in numerous films and television shows.

The last Marolt's role was in the multiple award-winning film The Abandoned (2010).

Death
Marolt died in his hometown of Sarajevo on 11 July 2009 after a long battle with cancer. He was buried two days later, on 14 July in Sarajevo at the Bare Cemetery.

Filmography

Film

Television

References

External links

1964 births
2009 deaths
20th-century Bosnia and Herzegovina male actors
Bosnia and Herzegovina male film actors
Bosnia and Herzegovina male stage actors
Bosnia and Herzegovina male television actors
Male actors from Sarajevo
Burials at Bare Cemetery, Sarajevo